Ulf Högberg (born 21 January 1946) is a Swedish middle-distance runner. He competed in the 1500 metres at the 1972 Summer Olympics and the 1976 Summer Olympics.

References

1946 births
Living people
Athletes (track and field) at the 1972 Summer Olympics
Athletes (track and field) at the 1976 Summer Olympics
Swedish male middle-distance runners
Olympic athletes of Sweden
Place of birth missing (living people)